GU, Gu, or gu may refer to:

Arts and entertainment

Music
 Gu (instrument), Chinese drums
 Bangu (drum) or Gu, a Chinese "flowerpot" drum
 Global Underground, an electronic dance music compilation series

Other media
 GU Comics, an online comic
 .hack//G.U., a video game series
 Godzilla: Unleashed, a video game

Universities
 Gandhara University, Peshawar, Khyber Pakhtunkhwa, Pakistan
 Gannon University, Erie, Pennsylvania, United States
 Gauhati University, Guwahati, Assam, India
 Georgetown University, Washington D.C., United States
 Ghazi University, Dera Ghazi Khan, Punjab, Pakistan
 GIFT University, Gujranwala, Punjab, Pakistan
 Gomal University, Dera Ismail Khan, Khyber Pakhtunkhwa, Pakistan
 Gonzaga University, Spokane, Washington, United States
 University of Gothenburg, Gothenburg, Sweden
 Grantham University, Kansas City, Missouri, United States
 Griffith University, several campuses in Brisbane and the Gold Coast area, Australia
 Guangxi University, Nanning, Guangxi, China
 Guangzhou University, Guangzhou, Guangdong, China
 University Of Guilan, Guilan, Rasht, Iran
 Guizhou University, Guiyang, Guizhou, China
 Gujrat University, Gujrat, Punjab, Pakistan
 Gujarat University, Ahmedabad, Gujarat, India

Businesses
 Gü, a company that produces a range of desserts
 G.U., Japanese clothing brand
 GU Energy Labs, a Berkeley, California-based company that produces sports nutrition products

Medicine
 Gastric ulcer, a disease of the stomach
 Genitourinary system, the reproductive system and the urinary system considered as a whole

People
 Gu (surname), a surname of Chinese origin, also found in Korea
 Gǔ (surname) 谷, meaning valley) came about when a noble family of the Zhou Dynasty was rewarded a fief in a valley area. The descendants of the family adopted the name to link their lineage to that history.
 Gŭ (surname 古), meaning ancient) is uncommon, being the 204th most common surname in China.
 Gū (surname) (辜) the family name Gū (meaning guilt) is very rare
 Gǔ (surname 骨) (meaning bone) is exceedingly rare in China.
 Gene Upshaw, an American football player

Places
 Green Ukraine, after the Russian Revolution of 1917, the Ukrainian Republic of the Far East
 Gu County, Shanxi, China
 Gu, Iran (disambiguation), any of several places in Iran
 Gu (administrative division), an administrative division of South Korea
 Gu's Park, former name of Fuxing Park in Shanghai, China
 GU postcode area, UK, covering west Surrey, north-east Hampshire, and a part of West Sussex
 Guam (postal code GU)

Other uses
 Gu (god), a god in Haitian Vodou and Yoruba (Africa) mythology
 Gu (poison), in Chinese poison sorcery
 Gu (vessel), a Chinese wine goblet from the Shang and Zhou dynasties, also 
 Gujarati language (ISO 639-1 language code)
 GU4 or GUD (𒄞), "bull" in the Sumerian language
 Gu-anna, the "Heavenly Bull", the Sumerian name for the constellation Taurus
 GU, a prefix for several types of bi-pin connectors for lamp sockets